The Malagasy orogeny is the Ediacaran to Cambrian orogeny that resulted as India collided with the already amalgamated African continent that consisted of Azania and the Congo-Tanzania-Bangweulu Block. The orogeny affected the parts of the East African Orogen that are now found in southern India, Madagascar and central Arabia.

In their reconstruction, India collided with Australia/Mawson in the Kuunga orogeny before the formation of Gondwana. They identified the Betsimisaraka suture in eastern Madagascar as the boundary between the African and India terranes.

See also 

 Geology of Madagascar
 Geology of India
 Geology of Tanzania
 Geology of Mozambique
 Geology of South Africa

References

Bibliography 

 
 

Orogenies of Africa
Ediacaran orogenies
Cambrian orogenies
Ediacaran Africa
Cambrian Africa
Geology of Madagascar